The Kenwyn Ground was a temporary rugby ground, in Cornwall, UK, built in an attempt to increase the fan base of the newly named Cornish Pirates. The move was controversial and caused resentment from some members and followers of Penzance and Newlyn RFC, as a "proud local name" was lost to the rugby world. The Pirates stayed for just one season (2005–06), playing twelve matches, moving to the Camborne Recreation Ground for the 2006–07 season. The move to Kenwyn was considered to be justified as the average attendance increased by 40% on the previous season.

History
The Kenwyn Ground was previously used by Truro Rugby Club in the early part of the 20th century and was the playing field for Truro Cathedral School for many years.

First Match
Sunday 18 September 2005. Cornish Pirates v Earth Titans  43 – 13 (att 2400)

Last Match
Sunday 16 April 2006. Cornish Pirates v Plymouth Albion  29 – 28 (att 3850)

Matches at Kenwyn Rugby Ground 2005–06

For completeness details of the final home league match of the season, played at the Mennaye Field, is also shown.

See also

Mennaye Field

References

External links
Pirates official site

Defunct rugby union venues in England
Rugby union stadiums in England
Sports venues in Cornwall
Truro
Rugby union in Cornwall
Cornish Pirates
Sports venues completed in 2005